The Wild Youth is the second EP by Daughter.

Track listing

Personnel
Vocals, bass, guitar, piano – Elena Tonra
Electric guitar, piano, programming, omnichord – Igor Haefeli
Drums, percussion – Remi Aguilella
Management – Matt Brown
Mastered by – Adam Nunn
Producer (additional) – Igor Haefeli
Recorded by, mixed by, producer – Ian Grimble

In media
The song "Medicine" was used on an episode of the American dance competition television show, So You Think You Can Dance?, on August 13, 2013, at the end of episode twenty of the third season (3x20) of CBS television show Person of Interest and in Covert Affairs ep 5x16 "Gold Soundz" during the final scene with Auggie and Annie talking about his leaving with Natasha.

The song "Home" was used in the 2013 movie How I Live Now, as well as Australian drama Wentworth in the final scenes of its third season.

References

Daughter (band) albums
2012 EPs
Glassnote Records EPs